Mirorictus taningi is a species of tubeshoulder only known from the Gulf of Panama where it is found at depths of around .  This species grows to a length of  TL.

References
 

Platytroctidae
Fish of the Pacific Ocean
Monotypic ray-finned fish genera
Fish described in 1947